Kamargoria is a village in Raina II CD Block in Bardhaman Sadar South subdivision of Purba Bardhaman district in the Indian state of West Bengal.

Demographics
As of 2011, Kamargoria hosts 735 families. The population numbers 3,366, of which 1,741 are males while 1,625 are females.

The population of children with age 0-6 is 344, comprising 10.22% of the total. The female sex ratio is 933, which is lower than West Bengal state average of 950. The child sex ratio is 944, which is lower than West Bengal average of 956.

In 2011, the literacy rate was 77.93% compared to 76.26% of West Bengal. Male literacy stands at 83.06% while female literacy was 72.43%.

Castes
Kamargoria village has substantial population of Scheduled Castes constituting 29.38% of the population. No members of Scheduled Tribe live there.

Economy
As of 2011, 1,166 people engaged in working activities. 92.54% of workers describe their work as their main work (employment or earning for more than 6 months/year) while 7.46% were involved in marginal activities (employment or earning for less than 6 months). 355 were cultivators (owner or co-owner) while 402 were agricultural labourers.

Administration 
As per the Constitution of India and Panchayati Raj Act, Kamargoria village is administrated by a Sarpanch (Head of the Panchayat) who is the leader of all the elected representatives of village.

Climate

Kamargoria's climate is classified as tropical. In winter, rainfall is much less than in summer. According to Köppen and Geiger, this climate is classified as Aw. The temperature averages 26.5 °C. The average rainfall is 1228 mm.

Notables
 Hare Krishna Konar (politician) was born and resident.
 Benoy Krishna Konar (politician) was a resident.
 Dasarathi Tah (politician) was resident.

Education
Hare Krishna Konar Smriti patagar is one of the prominent library of West Bengal is in this village only. Kamargoria Rashbehari Basu Shikshaniketan is a co-educational high school affiliated with the West Bengal Council of Higher Secondary Education.

References

Villages in Purba Bardhaman district